Camptoloma carum is a moth of the subfamily Arctiinae. It is endemic to Taiwan.

External links
 , 2005: Two new species of the genus Camptoloma (Lepidoptera: Noctuidae) from China. Florida Entomologist 88 (1): 34-37. Full article: 

Arctiinae
Moths described in 1984